Zojz is a settlement in the Prizren Municipality, southwestern Kosovo.

Geography 
Zojz is placed roughly 10 km north of Prizren. Neighboring settlements are Smaç and Medvec to the east, Piranë to the west, Sërbica e Poshtme to the south and Randobrava to the north. The Topluha River and the Autostrada R 7 run south of the village.

Demographics 
According to the 2011 census Zojz had 828 inhabitants. Of them, 813 (98.19%) were Albanians and 15 were Ashkali. All 828 inhabitants declared themselves Muslims.

Notes

References 

Villages in Prizren